Comcel may refer to:

Comcel Colombia, a Colombian mobile phone operator, now Claro Colombia
Comcel Haiti, a Haitian mobile phone operator that operates a TDMA network in Haiti